Jason Gregory White (born 19 October 1971) is an English former professional footballer. He played as a striker.

Career
White began his career with Derby County in 1990, but after failing to break into the Rams first team, he left to join Scunthorpe United the following year. In his first season with the North Lincolnshire club, they reached the Division Four play-off final, in which they faced Blackpool at Wembley. The match went to a sudden-death penalty-shootout, in which White, who was a second-half substitute for Tony Daws, sent his effort high over Blackpool goalkeeper Steve McIlhargey's crossbar to hand promotion to the Lancastrians. In his two years with Scunthorpe, White made 68 league appearances and scored 16 goals.

White joined Scarborough in 1994. He spent one year with the club, making 63 league appearances and scoring twenty goals. He was named Scarborough's Clubman of the Year. In 1995, he signed for Northampton Town, making a total of 77 league appearances and scored 18 goals. Two years later, he was on the move again, this time to Rotherham United making a total of 73 league appearances and scored 22 goals.

Cheltenham Town came in for his services in 2000, and in his three years at Whaddon Road, he made 31 league appearances and scored only one goal, against Leyton Orient. After a loan spell at Mansfield Town, White spent a short spell in Singapore with Sengkang Marine.

White  finished his career back in England with Grantham Town.

HonoursNorthampton Town'
Football League Third Division play-offs: 1997

References

1971 births
Living people
English footballers
Association football forwards
Derby County F.C. players
Scunthorpe United F.C. players
Darlington F.C. players
Scarborough F.C. players
Northampton Town F.C. players
Rotherham United F.C. players
Cheltenham Town F.C. players
Mansfield Town F.C. players
Hougang United FC players
Grantham Town F.C. players
English Football League players
Singapore Premier League players
English expatriate footballers
Expatriate footballers in Singapore